is a Japanese football player for FC Kariya.

Club statistics
Updated to 23 February 2020.

1Includes Promotion Playoffs to J2.

References

External links

Profile at Nagano Parceiro

1988 births
Living people
Kansai University alumni
Association football people from Nara Prefecture
Japanese footballers
J3 League players
Japan Football League players
AC Nagano Parceiro players
FC Kariya players
Association football forwards